Memorials is a 2020 South Korean television series starring Nana, Park Sung-hoon, Yoo Da-in, Han Joon-woo and Ahn Nae-sang. It aired on KBS2 every Wednesday and Thursday at 21:30 (KST) from July 1 to August 20, 2020.

The series is based on the screenplay by Moon Hyun-kyung which is the grand prize winner in Broadcasting Content Promotion Foundation (BCPF)'s 10th Find the Desert's Shooting Star Screenplay Competition, held in 2018.

Synopsis
Goo Se Ra (Nana), who has lived all 29 years of her life in Mawon-gu, is nothing but an underqualified struggler with a poor financial background. On one hand, this over-passionate, self-proclaimed Tax Guardian never lets a single wrongdoing slip through her until it is filed and settled as a civil complaint. However, because of her nosy nature and her tendency to lose temper over unrighteousness, she gets fired from an internship, from a contract position, and even from an outsourced job, to name a few from the list of her former employers. Although not intended, she finds herself gradually turning into a professional resignee and decides that it’s time for a change. This time, her passion steers toward the District Assembly, so called the employees’ utopia. In fact, now that she has entered the ring, her only option is to run for the office, to get elected, and to stay elected.

Cast

Main
 Nana as Koo Se-ra
 Kim Ha-yeon as Young Koo Se-ra
 Park Sung-hoon as Seo Gong-myung
 Yoo Da-in as Yoon Hee-soo
 Han Joon-woo as Kim Min-jae
 Ahn Nae-sang as Jo Maeng-deok

Supporting

Se-ra's family and friends 
 Ahn Gil-kang as Koo Young-tae, Se-ra's father
 Jang Hye-jin  as Kim Sam-sook, Se-ra's mother
 Kim Mi-soo as Kwon Woo-young, Se-ra's best friend
 Shin Do-hyun as Jang Han-bi, Se-ra's best friend
 Choi Go as Kim Ja-ryong, 9 year old kid Jang Han-bi babysits

Mawon-gu officials 
 Bae Hae-sun as Won So-jung
 Lee Seo-hwan as Heo Deok-gu
 Seo Jin-Won as Shim Jang-yang
 Han Dong-kyu as Jang Ha-woon
 Lee Chang-jik as Shi Dan-kyu
 Yoon Joo-sang as Bong Chu-san
 Oh Dong-min as Go Dong-chan
 Yu Seong-ju as Yang Nae-sung

Mawon-gu public officials 
 Park Sung-geun as Lee Dae-cheol
 Kim Hyun-mok as Jung Yong-kyu

Original soundtrack

Part 1

Part 2

Part 3

Part 4

Part 5

Part 6

Part 7

Ratings
In this table,  represent the lowest ratings and  represent the highest ratings.

Awards and nominations

References

External links
  (in Korean)
 
 
 

Korean-language television shows
2020 South Korean television series debuts
2020 South Korean television series endings
Korean Broadcasting System television dramas
South Korean romantic comedy television series
South Korean political television series
Television series by Celltrion Entertainment